Darlene Conley (July 18, 1934 – January 14, 2007) was an American actress.

Conley's career spanned fifty years, but she was best known for her performances in daytime television, and in particular, for her portrayal of larger-than-life fashion industrialist Sally Spectra on The Bold and the Beautiful. Conley played the role from 1989 until her death eighteen years later. Darlene's character Sally is the only soap opera character to be displayed at Madame Tussaud's wax figures galleries in Amsterdam and Las Vegas.

Life and career 
Conley, an Irish American, was born in Dublin, Ireland, the daughter of Melba (née Manthey) and Raymond Conley. In the late 1950s and early 1960s, Conley was employed with the traveling theater group the Chicago Uptown Circuit Players and Playwrights Company. She landed a bit part in the movie The Birds, which was followed by similar small roles in movies like Valley of the Dolls and Lady Sings the Blues. Darlene also appeared in the first episode of the fifth season of The Mary Tyler Moore Show as a prison warden.  Darlene appeared on Little House on the Prairie in 1981, in the episode entitled "A Wiser Heart."

Daytime television 
Darlene's performance as Rose DeVille on The Young and the Restless followed, with Conley playing many small roles on other soaps for most of the 1980s. She was the tough but basically decent prison warden Edith Hopkins on Days of Our Lives in 1983 during Liz Chandler's incarceration for Marie Horton's shooting. As Trixie on General Hospital from 1984 to 1988, she was an old hooker pal of Ruby's who worked at Kelly's. An encore as Rose De Ville inspired William J. Bell to cast her as flamboyant fashion maven Sally Spectra on his newer serial, The Bold and the Beautiful. She earned two Outstanding Supporting Actress Daytime Emmy nominations.

She was friends with several actors who appeared on "B&B", including Fabio, who has appeared on the show several times, usually under the guise of celebrating Sally's birthday. She was also friends with Phyllis Diller, who also appeared on the show as Sally's friend, Gladys Pope.

Illness and death 
Conley became ill in 2004 due to a fall that broke several bones. She recovered from the fall and returned to work (although she was usually seated during her scenes).

Reports surfaced in the media in the fall of 2006 that Conley had surgery and received treatment for stomach cancer. Conley died on January 14, 2007. B&B featured a tribute to Conley; John McCook presented the tribute, which featured her memorable moments on the show.

Sally Spectra 
Sally Spectra is still a character on B&B. Sally's absence has been explained by having her son CJ tell his father, Clarke (and viewers), that Sally had taken a permanent vacation in St. Tropez. Head writer Brad Bell said that Sally is "bigger than life" and will live on forever. 

In late 2007, Sally decided to sell her fashion house. Nick Marone and Jackie Marone bought Spectra and ran the company; in a later story in 2017, the show revisited many of the storylines of Sally Spectra to introduce a new younger character, also named Sally, who is the niece of the original Sally Spectra. The younger Spectra relaunched the house of Spectra fashion line. In addition, the show brought back the character of CJ to appear in several episodes.

Filmography 
The Birds (1963) – Waitress (uncredited)
Valley of the Dolls (1967) – Nurse in Sanitarium (uncredited)
Faces (1968) – Billy Mae
Captain Milkshake (1970) – Mrs. Hamilton
Minnie and Moskowitz (1971) – (uncredited)
Lady Sings the Blues (1972) – (uncredited)
Play It as It Lays (1972) – Kate's Nurse
Gentle Savage (1973) – Mac Moody
Rudolph and Frosty's Christmas in July (1979) – Mrs. Claus
Tough Guys (1986) – Gladys Ripps
The Oz Kids (1996) - Mombi

References

External links 
 

1934 births
2007 deaths
American film actresses
American soap opera actresses
American television actresses
Deaths from cancer in California
Deaths from stomach cancer
American people of Irish descent
Actresses from Chicago
20th-century American actresses
21st-century American women